Lampertheim is a town in the Bergstraße district in Hesse, Germany. In 1984, the town hosted the 24th Hessentag state festival.

Geography

Location
Lampertheim lies in the southwest corner of Hesse in the Rhine rift at the Biedensand Conservation Area (an old arm of the Rhine) and borders on Baden-Württemberg and Rhineland-Palatinate. The town is broadly, but visibly surrounded by the Odenwald and the Palatinate Forest.

Neighbouring communities
Lampertheim is one of Hesse’s southernmost towns and borders on Bürstadt, Lorsch, Viernheim and Mannheim (Baden-Württemberg).

Constituent communities
Lampertheim has the outlying centres of Hofheim, Hüttenfeld, Neuschloß and Rosengarten, which are all Stadtteile. Furthermore, there are residential neighbourhoods named Heide, Oberlach-Rosenau, Am Küblinger Damm, Lache, An der Wormser Straße, In den Böllenruthen, In den Ruthen, Wehrzollhaus, Wildbahn and Seehof.

History
The earliest forms of the town’s name handed down from 832 were Langobardonheim or Langbardheim, which led to the conclusion that the town was founded by the Lombards (Langobarden in German). There is however today no further doubt that Lampertheim arose at the time of Frankish settlement and that the name is to be taken as meaning “Lantberths’ Home”, the name “Lantberth” – also “Lampert” or “Lambert” – meaning “Land-brightening ones”. In 1716, the town was granted market rights, and on 4 August 1951 town rights.

Mayors

Mayors in Lampertheim since 1960:

Culture and sightseeing

Religion
Lampertheim has these parishes:
 Catholic parish of Mariä Verkündigung (the Annunciation)
 Evangelical parish of Martin Luther
 Catholic parish of St. Andreas (St. Andrew’s)
 Evangelical Lukasgemeinde (St. Luke’s)
 Evangelical Methodist parish
 Free Evangelical parish
 Evangelical Liebenzeller parish
 Baptist parish, New Apostolic Church

Museums
Stadtmuseum Lampertheim is the town museum. It is found in an old house and there are guided tours.

Music
At the Musikschule Lampertheim is a children’s choir led by Sabine Nicolai. One can also learn to play various instruments at the music school, such as violin, piano, flute, trumpet, and others. There is also singing instruction there, either singly or in groups of 3 or 4 pupils.

Buildings

Worth mentioning is the Schloss Rennhof built by Baron Rothschild in 1853 and the old schoolhouse built in 1906 and 1907, both in Hüttenfeld. In the Schloss Rennhof is found the Litauisches Gymnasium Hüttenfeld (“Lithuanian Gymnasium”), originally established as a school for Lithuanian émigrés’ children after their homeland was overrun by the Soviet Union in the Second World War. It is the only recognized Lithuanian school in Western Europe.

The many transmission masts of the shortwave broadcaster Radio Free Europe Lampertheim, one of the biggest shortwave transmission facilities in Germany, are up to 125 m tall. They are guyed steel-lattice masts, set in pairs in a row, bearing dipole antennae. Some of these transmission masts are linked to each other by crossbeams furnished with catwalks.

Sport
 DLRG Reitsport Weiland (riding)
 TV Lampertheim (gymnastics, football etc.)
 Wassersportverein Lampertheim 1929 e.V. (watersports, among others canoeing)
 Kanu-Club Lampertheim 1952 e.V.
 Olympia Lampertheim (football)

Regular events
The Lampertheimer Spargellauf (“Asparagus Walk”) is a public walking event that is traditionally held a week before the Lampertheim Asparagus Festival (Lampertheimer Spargelfest). It is staged by the Lampertheim Gymnastic Club. Every finisher gets a Spargellauf T-shirt, which comes in a different colour every year.

Economy and infrastructure

Transport
Lampertheim is on Bundesstraße 47, the Nibelungenstraße, which leads from Worms to Michelstadt in the Odenwald.

Lampterheim is also on Bundesstraße 44, which runs from Mannheim towards Biblis and further.

US activities
Near Lampertheim, the American foreign broadcasting service Radio Free Europe runs a shortwave transmission facility, and US troops run a United States Army and USAF base, Coleman Barracks, in neighbouring Mannheim-Sandhofen. Furthermore, American soldiers also train at a shooting range in the Lampertheim woods.

Education
In Lampertheim itself are four secondary schools, the Lessing Gymnasium Lampertheim, a Gymnasium that also received a certificate for “Promotion of the Gifted”. There are also the Alfred-Delp-Schule, a joint Hauptschule-Realschule, and the Biedensandschule, a special school for special-needs pupils. There is also the district vocational school.

Twin towns – sister cities

Lampertheim is twinned with:
 Ermont, France (1966)
 Maldegem, Belgium (1967)

 Adria, Italy (1979)
 Dieulouard, France (1993)
 Świdnica (rural gmina), Poland (2006)

Notable people
Wilhelm Herz (1912–1998), motorcycle racing driver and world record holder
Klaus Schlappner (born 1940), football coach
Manfred Herweh (born 1954), motorcycle racing driver
Elke Voelker (born 1968), organist, musicologist
Denis Gremelmayr (born 1981), tennis player
Carolin Leonhardt (born 1984), sprint canoer
Nicole Reinhardt (born 1986), canoeist, Olympic champion
Constantin Braun (born 1988), ice hockey player
Laurin Braun (born 1991), ice hockey player

References

External links
  

Bergstraße (district)